SM U-40 was a German Type U 31 U-boat of the German Imperial Navy during World War I.

Her construction was ordered on 12 June 1912 and her keel was laid down on 3 April 1913 by Germaniawerft of Kiel. She was launched on 22 October 1914 and commissioned on 14 February 1915 under the command of Gerhardt Fürbringer. Second officer was lieutenant Rudolf Jauch (of the Jauch family).

U-40 conducted one patrol, without sinking a ship.

Design
German Type U 31 submarines were double-hulled ocean-going submarines similar to Type 23 and Type 27 subs in dimensions and differed only slightly in propulsion and speed. They were considered very good high sea boats with average manoeuvrability and good surface steering.

The U-boat was armed with four  torpedo tubes, two fitted in the bow and two in the stern, and carried 6 torpedoes. Additionally U-40 was equipped in 1915 with one  Uk L/30 deck gun.
The boat's complement was 4 officers and 31 enlisted.

Fate
On the morning of 23 June 1915 U-40 stopped the trawler Taranaki in the North Sea. Taranaki was in fact a decoy vessel, or "Q-ship", and was connected to the submerged submarine  by a combined tow line and telephone cable. When U-40 stopped the trawler, Taranaki telephoned the situation to C24. When C24 tried to slip the tow line, however, the release mechanism failed, and C24 had to manoeuvre into an attacking position with a hundred fathoms of chain hanging from her bow. Her commander, Lieutenant Frederick Henry Taylor, was able to adjust her trim and avoid fouling the chain in the propellers and fired a single torpedo that struck U-40 amidships. The U-boat sank instantly, only three men in the conning tower surviving to be picked up by Taranaki.

Wreck discovery
The reported location of the sinking varied. According to some sources it was " southeast of Aberdeen".  Others suggested it was "east of the Firth of Forth".

References

Notes

Citations

Bibliography

*

External links
 SM U 40 First success of a Royal Navy 'Q' Ship
 Distinguished Service Cross of Lt. F.H. Taylor, awarded for the sinking SM U 40 in the collection of the National Maritime Museum

German Type U 31 submarines
U-boats commissioned in 1914
Maritime incidents in 1915
U-boats sunk in 1915
U-boats sunk by British submarines
World War I submarines of Germany
World War I shipwrecks in the North Sea
1914 ships
Ships built in Kiel